Tormato is the ninth studio album by English progressive rock band Yes. It was released on 22 September 1978 on Atlantic Records, and is their last album with singer Jon Anderson and keyboardist Rick Wakeman before their departure from the group in 1980. After touring their previous album Going for the One (1977), the band entered rehearsals in London to record a follow-up. The album was affected by various problems, such as internal disputes over the direction of the music and artwork, and the departure of engineer Eddy Offord early into the sessions, resulting in the group producing the album themselves.

The album received a mixed response from critics yet it became a commercial success. It reached No. 8 in the UK and No. 10 in the US, where it became the band's fastest selling album and reached platinum certification by the Recording Industry Association of America within two months for selling one million copies. "Don't Kill the Whale" was released as a single that reached No. 36 in the UK. The band's 1978–1979 tour was their first with concerts performed in the round on a central revolving stage. Tormato was remastered in 2004 containing previously unreleased tracks from the album's recording sessions.

Background 
In December 1977, the Yes line-up of Jon Anderson, Chris Squire, Steve Howe, Alan White and Rick Wakeman wrapped their 1977 tour of North America and Europe in support of their eighth album, Going for the One (1977). The album marked a return to commercial success after it went to number one in the UK for two weeks and spawned a UK top-10 single in "Wonderous Stories". The 84-date tour was considerably taxing on the group, and they took a short break at its conclusion.

Yes reconvened at Sound Associates in Bayswater, London in mid-February 1978 to write and rehearse material for a new studio album. The majority of the songs on Tormato were written during soundchecks and rehearsals on the 1977 tour, as the group decided to develop fresh ideas rather than using older material. The original plan was for Yes to release Tormato in two parts, with the first put out in July 1978 and the second by Christmas time. The second release was to be completed in Barbados, but this never happened and a single album was released instead. The album's original working title was Eleventh Illusion, a reference to the band's desire to base their live stage sets around illusions.

Recording 

Tormato was recorded from February to June 1978, and is the band's first recorded in two different London studios, Advision Studios in Fitzrovia and RAK Studios in Regent's Park. Initially they were split where the recording should take place; Howe and Squire wished to stay in London and suggested somewhere "warm and comfortable and easy", while others preferred to return to Switzerland where they had recorded Going for the One. The early studio sessions saw the return of Eddie Offord working with the band as their engineer and producer since Relayer (1974), but his involvement came to an end soon after. Left without a producer, the band decided to produce and mix the album themselves and hired Geoff Young and Nigel Luby, who had assisted with the production of Going for the One, as the engineers. This way of working caused internal issues as Wakeman recalled: "No one was afraid to say, 'Well, Jon, I think you should sing this part.' Or 'Steve, that's a bad guitar part.' Tempers got frayed." Howe agreed with the view, and believed such tensions affected the album's sound quality and tone as a result. By the end of the recording sessions, Yes had recorded enough material to fit on one and a half albums. Tormato was released with nine tracks (although "Future Times" and "Rejoice" are linked together), the most on a Yes studio album since Fragile (1971).

The album features the band playing new instruments that were not used on previous Yes albums. By the time of recording, Wakeman had changed his keyboard rig to incorporate the Polymoog, a polyphonic analog synthesiser which he said was used mainly for "soloing and filling", and the Birotron, a tape relay keyboard which he had co-funded during its development and manufacturing four years earlier. Wakeman reduced the number of keyboards he typically used so the tracks could relate to each other, thus creating an album that "flowed a bit more". In one incident, the band laid a prank on Wakeman while he was on a break by replacing the Birotron cartridges with a tape of Seals and Crofts. Howe said: "When he pressed the keys he went, 'What the hell is this?'" and "got quite cross", to the point that he walked out of the studio afterwards.

Looking back on the album a year after its release, Wakeman admitted he got it "60 percent right and 40 percent wrong", and wished he played things differently. One of Howe's criticisms of Tormato was that the Polymoog and Birotron did not complement his guitar sound and noted they often "cancel each other out". Squire felt as if Wakeman and Howe tried to play more notes than the other in a single bar, which was caused after Anderson would put down basic chords on an acoustic guitar and then take it out of the mix, leaving gaps in the music. Howe picked out "Madrigal", "Release, Release", and "On the Silent Wings of Freedom" as the tracks he liked best.

In 2013, engineer and producer Brian Kehew, who has worked on the remastering of other Yes albums, explained that the album sounds "thin, flat and terrible much like my own mixes." He said that Offord usually incorporated Dolby A, a type of Dolby noise-reduction system, in his production work, but upon examination of the original tapes Kehew could not locate any sign that Dolby A was used. After applying Dolby A to the tapes, Kehew said "everything – except from the overdubs – sounded amazing". Kehew then realised that the engineers who replaced Offord may not have known that the Dolby reduction had in fact been used.

Howe has been quoted as saying that none of the band can possibly remember how to play most of the songs on the album. He confirmed this in his 2021 memoir, All My Yesterdays, noting that Yes has not performed much from Tormato since the ensuing tour, and even then some songs from the album proved unworkable. "'On the Silent Wings of Freedom' was actually often tried at tour rehearsals but it would just fall apart. 'Future Times/Rejoice' was similarly unsuccessful" he recalls. Howe attributes this failure to the songs bringing back memories of the emotions their recording aroused. "The improvised sections didn't jell and the songs somehow didn't sit comfortably enough."

Songs

Side one
Anderson wrote the music and lyrics to "Future Times/Rejoice" and said his words are more explicit in meaning than his usual style. It features Squire playing bass with a Mu-Tron pedal effect.

"Don't Kill the Whale" originated from a bass line and a passage on an acoustic guitar that Squire had devised which he presented to Anderson, who proceeded to write lyrical ideas off of it using a poem that he had written on the subject as a basis. The acoustic line was worked into the song's chorus. Squire had the idea while the group were in Switzerland working on Going for the One, and the lyrics were inspired by a television program that Anderson saw about saving tigers, which prompted him to write words for a song about saving whales. The song was also inspired by the band's friendship with Terry Doran, who had invited Yes to perform at a benefit concert for the whale movement, but they were too busy working in the studio. The keyboard solo involved Wakeman adapting a sound that he had configured on his Polymoog which produced "weird sounds" that resembled a whale.

"Madrigal" features Wakeman playing a Thomas Goff harpsichord. Anderson had suggested to Wakeman that they write a madrigal, a form of English evening song.

"Release, Release" was developed by Anderson and White, and features automatic double tracking applied onto White's drum tracks to achieve a bigger sound. Its original title was "The Anti-Campaign", referring to the political and social changes at the time before it was changed in favour of the lyric "Release, release" that is sung multiple times at the end. The instrumental section includes a crowd cheering with the guitar and drum solo, which Wakeman reasoned was added because it "sounded a bit dry" on its own. He claimed the crowd was taken from an English football match. Atlantic Records president Ahmet Ertegun visited Yes in the studio and heard "Release, Release", which he liked and suggested the whole album sound like it. The song was difficult for Anderson to sing on stage as the many high notes in the song strained his voice, and it was dropped early into the tour.

Side two
"Arriving UFO" is based on a tune that Anderson had developed, inspired to write a science-fiction song having seen Close Encounters of the Third Kind (1977) twice. Wakeman wrote the instrumental section.

"Circus of Heaven" tells the story of a travelling fantasy circus and its visit to a Midwestern town, featuring unicorns, centaurs, elves, and fairies. Its direction came from Anderson's pursuit of writing songs aimed at children, and gained inspiration from a book by Ray Bradbury ten years before which he subsequently told to his son Damion, who speaks at the end of the song. Squire thought the track was an interesting one musically as it features him playing a reggae-style bass riff.

"Onward" is solely credited to Squire, who had produced a demo version of the song on vocals and piano and presented it to the band. It features orchestral arrangements by his friend Andrew Pryce Jackman, who had worked with Squire as members of The Syn and on Squire's solo album Fish Out of Water (1975). Squire later considered "Onward" as one of the best songs he ever wrote. "Onward" was performed live in 1996 and features an acoustic guitar introduction from Howe entitled "Unity". This was released on their live/studio album Keys to Ascension (1996).

"On the Silent Wings of Freedom" features Squire playing with a Mu-Tron Envelope Shaper effect.

Artwork 

As with Going for the One, the album's cover was designed by Hipgnosis but retains the band's logo designed by Roger Dean. Howe pitched the album's original title of Yes Tor, referring to Yes Tor, the second highest hill on Dartmoor, an area of moorland in Devon, England. Wakeman claimed to have thrown a tomato at the pictures taken for the album as he recalled the band were disappointed with the initial artwork which had cost a lot of money. The album's title and cover was changed accordingly. Howe said it was someone at Hipgnosis who threw the tomato and they did so on purpose, which insulted him. According to White, the band was unable to decide on a cover: "I think Po ... put a picture of a guy with divining sticks on the front. He took it home one night and decided it wasn't working. So he threw a tomato at it". Yes manager Brian Lane said the band disliked the pictures that Hipgnosis had taken at Yes Tor, "and we threw the tomatoes. [...] It wasn't Rick". Squire compared the tomato gimmick to the lunacy of the Marx Brothers.

The sleeve includes a photograph of the band that was taken in Regent's Park, London, with each member wearing a bomber jacket and sunglasses and looking in a different direction. Each jacket was labelled with the member's name on the front, but Squire had forgotten his and had to wear one labelled "Jim", belonging to tour manager Jim Halley. The word "Chris" was then drawn onto the final cover.

Release 
Tormato was released in the UK on 22 September 1978. Upon its release in the US, the album was broadcast in its entirety on WIOQ in Philadelphia at midnight on 29 September. It reached No. 8 on the UK Albums Chart and No. 10 on the US Billboard 200. On 25 August 1978, "Don't Kill the Whale" was released as a single in the UK which peaked at No. 36. Yes donated money for every copy of the single that was sold to Greenpeace, a charity helping to end large scale whale slaughter.

The album reached Gold certification by the British Phonographic Industry on 13 September 1978. It became Yes's first album to be certified Platinum by the Recording Industry Association of America for selling one million copies in the US. A reception for the band was held after their gig at the Los Angeles Forum to commemorate the award and their tenth anniversary.

Reception 

Record World summarised that Tormato brings "the Yes stamp of intriguing music" and recognised "Don't Kill the Whale" as a potential hit single. Audio magazine gave the album's sound an "A" and the performance a "A-" rating. In its review, Tormato "shows the most song consciousness of any Yes has done in a long while", with its "song-sized ideas, instead of murals". The result shows Yes more economical in its song arrangements, with "exemplary" production and "excellent" sound quality. "Don't Kill the Whale" was praised for its musical power and message without sounding "heavy-headed", as was "Future Times/Rejoice" and "Release, Release" for their "progressive thrusts with solid beats". The review compared "Circus of Heaven" to the fantasy comedy film 7 Faces of Dr. Lao (1964). Cash Box thought with Tormato, "Yes reaffirms its strong artistic and popular stature" and, like Going for the One, "is a welcome away from Yes' extended jamming and massive concept works of the mid '70s". The album has "intricate, sophisticated yet rocking textures" with "first-rate" riffs from Howe and Wakeman.

A more critical review was published by Sheila Prophet in Record Mirror, who considered summaried it as "The Sunday school of rock" and "maximum pomposity, maximum pretension, maximum elaboration, all covering up minimum inspiration". Steve Pond gave a mixed review in The Los Angeles Times, noting a lack of distinctive melodies and more experimental and extended instrumental sections similar to that of Tales from Topographic Oceans (1973) and Relayer (1974), which made them "distant and unappetizing". However, Pond continues to note that "eventually, it emerges as one of Yes' strongest and most important albums" with its balance of songs that display the band's traditional sound along with the contemporary progressive rock approach. He picked up on the album's "raw energy and forcefulness" which made Going for the One such a success, with "Future Times/Rejoice" as a good example of the band's new approach and praised White and Squire as a rhythm section. Pond was critical of "Arriving UFO" and "Circus of Heaven", which he considered are overwhelmed by "studio trickery and sound effects". Yes biographer Chris Welch said the weakest thing about the album is the production quality, typified by a compressed and dull sound. Wakeman later called Tormato "a tragedy" because of its poor artwork and production, despite the record containing good music.

Reissues 
1988 – Atlantic – CD
1994 – Atlantic – CD (Remastered)
2004 – Rhino – CD (Remastered with bonus tracks)
2018 – Atlantic – LP (40th anniversary picture disc edition issued for Record Store Day, limited to 5,400 copies).

Tour
Yes supported the album with a 101-date tour of North America and the UK, between 28 August 1978 and 30 June 1979. The UK dates comprised just six consecutive nights at London's Wembley Arena in October 1978. The tour featured the band performing in-the-round with a six-ton circular revolving stage placed in the middle of the arena that cost £50,000 to build, with a 360-degree lighting and sound system fitted above it. Anderson stood on a raised platform in the middle of the stage that turned the opposite way to the band to avoid dizziness. The sound crew sat beneath the stage in an area that had a drinks cabinet. The stage revolved at 1 mph four times per hour; the driving motor failed during one early gig, so the band's roadies had to come out and rotate the stage by hand. The idea was conceived by their longtime technician Michael Tait, who worked with their sound company, Clair Brothers, to develop the sound system to go with it.

Yes entered the stage to different pieces, including The Firebird by Igor Stravinsky, The Young Person's Guide to the Orchestra by Benjamin Britten, and an excerpt from the soundtrack to Close Encounters of the Third Kind. The tour marked the group's tenth anniversary, and the band performed a 30-minute medley that included excerpts from as far back as their debut album, Yes (1969). The 1978 leg included four consecutive sold out nights at Madison Square Garden in New York City that sold out in three days and earned the group a Gold Ticket Award for selling 100,000 tickets and grossing over $1 million in box office receipts. Yes performed three additional dates there in June 1979. Recordings from the tour were included on the live album Yesshows (1980).

Track listing

Notes

Personnel 
Credits adapted from the album's 1978 liner notes.

Yes
Jon Anderson – vocals, 10-string Alvarez guitar (1, 5 and 8)
Steve Howe – Gibson Les Paul Custom guitar, Martin 000–45, Fender Broadcaster, Gibson ES-175, Gibson acoustic guitar, mandolin, Spanish guitar, vocals
Chris Squire – harmonised Rickenbacker bass, Gibson Thunderbird bass, bass pedals, piano (2), vocals
Rick Wakeman – Birotron, Hammond organ, Polymoog synthesizer, piano, harpsichord, RMI Electra Piano
Alan White – drums, military snare drum (1), glockenspiel, crotales, cymbals, bell tree, drum synthesizer (5), gongs, vibraphone, vocals (4)

Technical personnel
Geoff Young – engineer
Nigel Luby – engineer
Peter Woolliscroft – additional engineering
Pete Schwier – additional engineering
Sean Davis – disk cutting at Strawberry Studios, London
Brian Lane – executive producer
Hipgnosis – sleeve design, photography
Rob Brimson – photography (Yes Tor and tomato)
Colin Elgie - graphics
Roger Dean – Yes logo design

Charts

Certifications

References 
Citations

Sources

 

Yes (band) albums
1978 albums
Albums with cover art by Hipgnosis
Atlantic Records albums
Albums recorded at RAK Studios